543 was a year.

543 may also refer to:
543 (number)
543 BC
List of United States Supreme Court cases, volume 543
List of highways numbered 543
List of state leaders in 543
543 Charlotte
Unit 543
Area code 543
The 5-4-3 rule for configuring Ethernet networks